Monex may refer to:
Monex Group, a financial services company in Tokyo, Japan
Monex Financial Services, a payment company in Killarney, Ireland
Monex Precious Metals, a bullion dealer in Newport Beach, United States
Holding Monex, a foreign exchange firm in Mexico City, Mexico
Monex Europe previously Schneider Foreign Exchange, a subsidiary of Holding Monex
Monexgroup, a payment processing company in Toronto, Ontario